Jason Netherton (born 5 October 1982) is an English former professional rugby league footballer who spent most of his career playing for the Hull Kingston Rovers in the Super League.

Jason Netherton, or 'Nev' was born in Hull, but was signed-up by Leeds Rhinos from local amateur club West Hull. He is noted for his high work rate and tenacious defence, provides Rovers with plenty of the all important power in the pack. On 3 June 2011, Jason signed a new deal with the Hull Kingston Rovers until the end of the 2013 season.

In 2013, after 160 Super League matches, Netherton, now 30, was released from his contract with Hull Kingston Rovers and linked up with the Mackay Cutters for the 2013 and 2014 seasons of the Queensland Cup. the Mackay Cutters are the feeder club to NRL side North Queensland Cowboys.

References

External links
Statistics at rugbyleagueproject.org

1982 births
Living people
English rugby league players
Hull Kingston Rovers players
Leeds Rhinos players
London Broncos players
Rugby league players from Kingston upon Hull
Rugby league second-rows